Tiedra is a municipality located in the province of Valladolid, Castile and León, Spain. According to the 2004 census (INE), the municipality has a population of 394 inhabitants.

www.tiedra.es

See also
Cuisine of the province of Valladolid

Municipalities in the Province of Valladolid